This is a list of caves in Nepal.

Bagdwara Cave
Bat Cave (Chamere Cave)
Chobhar caves
Gupteshwor cave
Mahadev Parwati Cave
Mahendra Cave
Maratika Cave
Mustang Caves
Siddha cave
Badrinath cave

References

 
Nepal
Lists of tourist attractions in Nepal
Caves